Leonidas Mahlon Godley (June 13, 1836 – May 23, 1904) was a Union Army soldier during the American Civil War. He received the Medal of Honor for gallantry during the Siege of Vicksburg on May 22, 1863.

Union assault
On May 22, 1863, General Ulysses S. Grant ordered an assault on the Confederate heights at Vicksburg, Mississippi. The plan called for a storming party of volunteers to build a bridge across a moat and plant scaling ladders against the enemy embankment in advance of the main attack.
The volunteers knew the odds were against survival and the mission was called, in nineteenth century vernacular, a "forlorn hope". Only single men were accepted as volunteers and even then, twice as many men as needed came forward and were turned away. The assault began in the early morning following a naval bombardment.

The Union soldiers came under enemy fire immediately and were pinned down in the ditch they were to cross. Despite repeated attacks by the main Union body, the men of the forlorn hope were unable to retreat until nightfall. Of the 150 men in the storming party, nearly half were killed.  Seventy-nine of the survivors were awarded the Medal of Honor.

Medal of Honor citation
The President of the United States of America, in the name of Congress, takes pleasure in presenting the Medal of Honor to First Sergeant Leonidas Mahlon Godley, United States Army, for extraordinary heroism on 22 May 1863, while serving with Company E, 22d Iowa Infantry, in action at Vicksburg, Mississippi. First Sergeant Godley led his company in the assault on the enemy's works and gained the parapet, there receiving three very severe wounds. He lay all day in the sun, was taken prisoner, and had his leg amputated without anesthetics.

See also

List of American Civil War Medal of Honor recipients: G-L

References

External links
Military Times Hall of Valor
A Forlorn Hope
Iowa Medal of Honor Heroes

1836 births
1904 deaths
American Civil War recipients of the Medal of Honor
Military personnel from West Virginia
People from Mason County, West Virginia
People of Iowa in the American Civil War
People of West Virginia in the American Civil War
United States Army Medal of Honor recipients
Union Army soldiers